Debra "Debbie" Mason (born 31 January 1968) is a British long-distance runner. She represented Great Britain running the marathon at the 2005 World Championships in Athletics. She also represented England in two Commonwealth Games.

Career

Mason had suffered from anorexia and returned to running with her daughter.
She was a member of Sutton-in-Ashfield Harriers Athletics Club when she won the Dublin Marathon in 2001, in a time of 2:35:40, running as Robinson.
She then joined Tipton Harriers. The Dublin performance enabled her to represent England at the 2002 Commonwealth Games marathon, where she finished fourth and was top  woman from the United Kingdom. In 2003 a win at the Bath Half Marathon and competing in the 2003 IAAF World Half Marathon Championships secured her place on the world stage.

Mason missed out on the 2004 Olympics, but beating Tracey Morris into second place in the Liverpool Half Marathon followed by a London Marathon time of 2:36:59 qualified her for a place at the 2005 World Championships in Athletics, with Paula Radcliffe, Hayley Haining, Mara Yamauchi and Liz Yelling
And also a place on the England squad for the Marathon at the 2006 Commonwealth Games.
Although she did not finishing at either of these events.

Mason did complete the Half Marathon at the 2005 IAAF World Half Marathon Championships.

Competition record

References

External links

1968 births
Living people
British female long-distance runners
British female marathon runners
Athletes (track and field) at the 2002 Commonwealth Games
Athletes (track and field) at the 2006 Commonwealth Games
Commonwealth Games competitors for England